Bishop of Rockhamption may refer to:

 Anglican Bishop of Rockhampton
 Bishop of the Roman Catholic Diocese of Rockhampton